Duchy of Poland was a state in Central Europe, may refer to:

Historical political entities
Duchy of Poland (Civitas Schinesghe), a duchy existing from around 960 to 1025
Duchy of Poland, a duchy existing from 1031 to 1076
Duchy of Poland, a duchy existing from 1079 to 1138
Duchy of Poland, a confederal duchy existing from 1138 to 1227

See also
 List of Polish monarchs
 Kingdom of Poland